Marian University is a Roman Catholic university in Fond du Lac, Wisconsin. It was founded in 1936 by the Congregation of Sisters of Saint Agnes, which continues to sponsor the university today.

Marian University has an enrollment of approximately 2000 undergraduate and graduate students. Seventy-one percent of students are women. Ninety-four percent of students receive financial aid. Approximately 32% of undergraduate students live on campus.

History
Marian University opened as Marian College of Fond du Lac, Wisconsin on September 8, 1936, with 17 full-time and 25 part-time students and eight faculty. The Congregation of Sisters of St. Agnes founded the college in response to a Wisconsin Department of Instruction decision that nuns were not allowed to teach in public schools while wearing their religious habits.

Marian became accredited in elementary education in 1941. The first graduating class in August 1941 had eight nun graduates. The first lay students graduated in 1942. Marian had 86 full-time and 145 part-time students in 1950, who attended classes in a convent next to St. Agnes Hospital. Although founded as a women's college, the superintendent of Fond du Lac schools attended art and music classes with his wife in 1940. Increasing enrollment caused the college to move to its current  campus on Fond du Lac's east side in the mid 1960s, and the college became co-educational in 1970.

The school became accredited by the North Central Association for a Master's of Arts program in 1987, and was approved for a Ph.D. program in Leadership Studies in 2002.

On May 1, 2008, Marian College of Fond du Lac changed its name to Marian University to reflect an expansion of its programs and classes and to position the institution for continued growth.

Marian University consists of two Colleges: the College of the Professions and the College of Arts, Sciences and Letters.

Accreditation
Marian became affiliated with The Catholic University of America and the National Catholic Educational Association in 1949. It became accredited with the North Central Association of Colleges and Schools for teacher education in 1960.

Marian University is accredited by the North Central Association, International Assembly for Collegiate Business Education, National League for Nursing, Council on Social Work Education, National Council for Accreditation of Teacher Education, and the Commission on Collegiate Nursing Education. Marian's curriculum has been approved by the Wisconsin Department of Public Instruction, Wisconsin State Board of Nursing, and certified by the Wisconsin Department of Justice Law Enforcement Standards Board Training and Standards Bureau.

Academic degrees
Marian University offers 11 bachelor's degrees, four master's degrees, and one doctoral degree.

Catholic environment
Undergraduate students are required to take 6 credits (2 courses) in Theology and 3 credits (1 course) in Philosophy. Graduate level programs include courses that are grounded in Catholic teaching.

The Campus Ministry at Marian University provides many activities for students to deepen their understanding of the Catholic tradition: weekly Mass, retreats, sacraments, Scripture study, Rosary, adoration of the Blessed Sacrament, and outreach to the local area.

Publications
45 South is Marian University's literary magazine. The Sabre is its online newspaper.

Athletics
Marian University's athletic teams' nickname is the Sabres. Its colors are blue and white.

Students participate in sports at the NCAA Division III level in women's basketball, golf, hockey, soccer, softball, tennis, and volleyball, and men's baseball, basketball, golf, hockey, soccer, men's volleyball, tennis and lacrosse. Teams have held membership in the Northern Athletics Collegiate Conference since 2006, after holding membership in the Lake Michigan Conference from 1974 to 2006. Marian University's men's hockey team participates in the Northern Collegiate Hockey Association. Women's hockey is a member of the Northern Collegiate Hockey Association, and the men's volleyball team competes in the Midwest Collegiate Volleyball League. Since starting an intercollegiate athletic program in 1972, the Sabres have won 62 conference titles. Since joining the NCAA in 1997, seven different programs have competed in the NCAA Division III National Tournament.

Notable alumni
 Sr. Dianne Bergant, CSA (1961) - author and scripture scholar
 Patrick G. Coy (1979) - author and scholar in the field of conflict resolution
 Amy Sue Vruwink (1997) - member of the Wisconsin State Assembly

References

External links
 Official website
 Official athletics website

 
Fond du Lac, Wisconsin
Educational institutions established in 1936
Education in Fond du Lac County, Wisconsin
Buildings and structures in Fond du Lac County, Wisconsin
Catholic universities and colleges in Wisconsin
Roman Catholic Archdiocese of Milwaukee
1936 establishments in Wisconsin